2011 Miami-Dade County mayoral special election may refer to:

 2011 Miami-Dade County mayoral recall election
 2011 Miami-Dade County mayoral special election